Sir Herbert James Creedy GCB KCVO (3 May 1878 – 3 April 1973) was a British civil servant. Creedy was Secretary of the War Office from 1920 to 1924 and Permanent Under-Secretary of State for War from 1924 to 1939.

References 

 https://www.oxforddnb.com/view/10.1093/ref:odnb/9780198614128.001.0001/odnb-9780198614128-e-30982

1878 births
1973 deaths
Place of birth missing
Place of death missing